The Cairoli I government of Italy held office from 24 March 1878 until 19 December 1878, a total of 270 days, or 8 months and 25 days.

Government parties
The government was composed by the following parties:

Composition

References

Italian governments
1878 establishments in Italy
1878 disestablishments in Italy